Mirbelia speciosa  is a species of flowering plant in the family Fabaceae and is endemic to eastern Australia. It is an erect shrub with narrowly linear leaves arranged in whorls of three, and bluish-purple flowers usually arranged singly in leaf axils.

Description

Taxonomy
Mirbelia speciosa was first formally described in 1825 by Augustin Pyramus de Candolle Augustin Pyramus de Candolle in his Prodromus Systematis Naturalis Regni Vegetabilis from an unpublished description by Franz Sieber. The specific epithet “speciosa” means "showy", referring to flowers.

In 1977, Leslie Pedley reduced M. ringrosei F.M.Bailey to M. speciosa subsp. ringrosei in the journal Austrobaileya, and the name and that of the autonym (subsp. speciosa), are accepted by the Australian Plant Census:

Distribution and habitat
This mirbelia grows in heath, woodland and forest north from the Illawarra region in New South Wales to north Queensland.

Use in horticulture
This species is not recommended for clay soils that are not well drained or sites with excessive frost. A sunny situation is preferred, though it does better with a small amount of shade. Fertilizers may be used, but are only recommended if they have a low pH (higher acid) levels.

This plant strikes easily from tip cuttings. Alternatively, seed propagation is also successful. Seeds may be treated by very hot (but not boiling) water for two minutes. After drying overnight, they should be planted and placed in a sunny situation. Germination usually occurs within two weeks.

References

Mirbelioids
speciosa
Fabales of Australia
Flora of New South Wales
Flora of Queensland
Garden plants
Taxa named by Augustin Pyramus de Candolle
Plants described in 1825